The Stillwater News Press  is a newspaper published in Stillwater, Oklahoma, United States. It is owned by CNHI. As of April 2020, it changed to printing on Tuesday, Thursday and Saturday from a six-day-a-week morning daily schedule.

In addition to Stillwater, the News Press covers the Payne County communities of Cushing, Glencoe, Perkins, Ripley and Yale; the Noble County communities of Morrison and Perry; Pawnee in Pawnee County; and Coyle in Logan County.

References

External links
 News Press Website
 CNHI Website

Newspapers published in Oklahoma
Payne County, Oklahoma